Valagamba (Sinhala: වළගම්බා), also known as Wattagamani Abhaya and Valagambahu, was a king of the Anuradhapura Kingdom of Sri Lanka. Five months after becoming king, he was overthrown by a rebellion and an invasion from South India, but regained the throne by defeating the invaders fourteen years later. He is also known for the construction of the Abhayagiri Dagaba.

Accession to the throne
Valagamba was the fourth son of King Saddha Tissa, the brother of Dutugamunu. His three elder brothers, Thulatthana, Lanja Tissa and Khallata Naga, ruled the country before him. A general of the army named Kammaharattaka (Maharattaka) killed Khallata Naga and seized power. Valagamba in turn killed Kammaharattaka and took over the throne in 103 BC.

He adopted Mahaculika, the son of Khallatanaga, as his own son, and took Anuladevi, Mahaculika's mother, as his queen. He also had another queen named Somadevi.

Rebellion, invasion and Famine 
Five months after his coronation as king, a Brahmin in Rohana named Tissa rebelled against him. At the same time, an invading army from South India led by seven Tamil leaders landed in Mahatittha. Tissa and the seven Tamil leaders all sent messages to Valagamba, telling him to hand over power to them. Valagamba informed the Brahmin Tissa that the kingdom will be his and told him to defeat the invading army. Accepting this, Tissa tried to fight but was defeated by the Tamils.

After this, the seven Tamil leaders waged war against Valagamba, and defeated him in a battle at Kolambalaka. While the king was fleeing in a chariot, a nirgrantha (Jain) named Giri shouted that the king was fleeing. Valagamba resolved to build a temple there, and later built the Abhayagiriya after he regained the throne. When the pursuers were gaining on them, Queen Somadevi got down from the chariot to lighten it and give the king a chance to escape, and was captured. The Pathra Dathu (a sacred bowl relic) was also taken to India. The five Dravidians namely Pulahatta, Bahiya, Panya Mara, Pilaya Mara and Dathika ruled Anuradhapura for 14 years although they fell out with each other with each of the five who was ruling killed by his successor. 

Valagamba fled to Malayarata for safety and a monk named Kuppikkala Mahatissa helped him while he was in hiding. The king organized a large army in order to attack Anuradhapura and defeat the invading army. However, a rift between him and his ministers resulted in them leaving him and thus weakening the army. However, the Sangha brought about a reconciliation and Valagamba resumed his preparations for attacking Anuradhapura. 

There was a huge drought called Baminitiya saya (බැමිණිතියාසාය). Humanity in Sri Lanka has been approached to the utmost butchering since of this drought. According to early sages, the people lived in the country merely looked like just skeletons and brawn. Plagues had debut to pervade as the corpses piled, sundry of diseases transmitted across the country. Because of the anarchy, the country escalated through the history without knowing that the human exist. Buddhism had reached to the plummet of degradation in the cause of intrusions and the death of monks.

Regaining power
Around 89 BC, Valagamba regained the throne after defeating Dathika, the last of the invading Tamil leaders, and ruled the country for twelve years until his death in 77 BC. He sent for Somadevi and restored her as queen, and built a temple named Somarama or Somawathie in her honour.

Services

The Abhayagiri temple became one of the three main Buddhist institutions in the country. He converted the caves he was hiding in to a temple. This temple is known as the Dambulla Rock Temple. King Valagamba also built several other temples. The Tripitaka, which had been handed down orally by the Bhikkhu order, was recorded on palm leaves in the Aluvihara Temple, Matale during the Fourth Buddhist Council.

Religious conflict
The Abayagiri Stupa was offered to Kuppikala Mahatissa Thero by the king to show his gratitude. This was the first time a temple was offered privately to a monk and it caused the first conflict between the Sangha when 500 Bhikkus decided to leave Mahavihara and join Abayagiriya where they created another sect. This is the first schism in Buddhism in Sri Lanka.

There is a major discrepancy between the sources which cite the death of Valagamba of Anuradhapura as occurring in 77 BC and his patronization of the effort to commit the Buddhist oral traditions to writing in the period 29 to 17 BC as cited by Norman.

The Dipavamsa states that during the reign of Valagamba (Vattagamani Abhaya) (29–17 BC) the monks who had previously remembered the Tipitaka and its commentary orally now wrote them down in books, because of the threat posed by famine, war, and the growing power of the newly established Abhayagiri vihara, which enjoyed the king's favour. The Mahavamsa also refers briefly to the writing down of the canon and the commentaries at this time.

This chronology which places Vattagamani's second reign in 29–17 BC was originally devised in 1912 by Wilhelm Geiger in the preface to his translation of the Mahavamsa. This 1912 chronology does not agree with date assignments calculated by later researchers into Sinhalese history.

Popular culture
The Sinhala-language film Aloko Udapadi was released on 20 January 2017, describing the life of King Valagamba, Uddika Premarathna played Valagamba's character.

See also
 List of Sri Lankan monarchs
 Beminitiya Seya

References

External links
 Kings & Rulers of Sri Lanka
 Codrington's Short History of Ceylon

77 BC deaths
Monarchs of Anuradhapura
Year of birth unknown
Sinhalese kings
 Sinhalese Buddhist monarchs
House of Vijaya
2nd-century BC Sinhalese monarchs
1st-century BC Sinhalese monarchs